MA-2 may refer to:

 MA-2 bomber jacket, a nylon flight jacket
 Massachusetts Route 2
 Massachusetts Route 2A
 The abbreviation for  Massachusetts's 2nd congressional district
 Mercury-Atlas 2, a test flight of Project Mercury
 Meysam Amiri of alborz,